was a Japanese jidaigeki (period drama) broadcast on prime-time television that ran from 1975 to 1981. Its lead star was Yūzō Kayama.

The series was based on Kazuo Shimada's novel of the same title. It became a popular broadcast, leading to the production of five series and a two-hour special.

Plot

Characters 
Yūzō Kayama as Chiaki Joenosuke
Keiju Kobayashi as Hayashida Magobei
Minoru Chiaki as Hayami Shigetaro
Yousuke Kondō as Takase
Masaaki Tsusaka as Sanai
Ryō Ikebe as Nezu (first series, episodes 14-49)
Kunie Tanaka as Yura (first series)
Takeo Chii as Mihoki (first series)
Mie Hama as Oyou (first series)
Shigeru Tsuyuguchi as Shimazu Hanzō (series II-IV)
Masaya Oki as Tachibana Seiichirō (Shin Edo no Kaze)
Yasuaki Kurata as Todō Ken (Shin Edo no Kaze)
Atsushi Watanabe as Higure Shinsaku (Shin Edo no Kaze)

Seasons 
Edo no Kaze (1975–76) - 49 episodes
Edo no Kaze II (1976–77) - 53 episodes
Edo no Kaze III (1977–78) - 50 episodes
edo no Kaze IV (1978–79) - 26 episodes
Shin edo no Kaze (1980–81) - 31 episodes
Edo no Kaze Special (1983) - two-hour special

References

1975 Japanese television series debuts
1970s drama television series
Jidaigeki television series
Television shows based on Japanese novels